Klarion the Witch Boy is a supervillain appearing in American comic books published by DC Comics, having first appeared in The Demon #7 (March 1973) and was created by Jack Kirby. The character is typically portrayed as a powerful but mischievous, immature extradimensional warlock who serves as both the archenemy of Etrigan the Demon and is a reoccurring adversary for various mystic characters and teams in the DC Universe.

The character has also been adapted in media, having made appearance in animated series such as Batman: The Animated Series, Young Justice, and Justice League Action.

Fictional character biography

Kirby's Klarion
Klarion is a young practitioner of the dark arts from Witch World, an otherworldly dimension where everyone is at least somewhat knowledgeable about dark magic. The problem was, being a child, he was constantly under the direction of adults who dictated what he could and could not do with his powers, as well as what kind of sorcery he could study. Chafing under this supervision Klarion secretly used his power to open a gateway into the normal universe, and he and his cat familiar, Teekl, embarked on a journey to learn all there was to know about witchcraft, as well as cause some chaos along the way.

He soon attracts the attention of the demon Etrigan, who attempts to send him back to his own dimension several times. A rivalry sparked between the two, and their battles often came down to a competition of spellcraft. In addition to Etrigan, Klarion also crossed paths with Wonder Woman (whose then-friend and roommate Etta Candy was sent to Hell by them), the Flash, Batman, Chase, and Superboy's Ravers.

Not only could Klarion use his magic to wreak havoc, but his cat, Teekl, could assume a were-form under his direction. This granted her increased agility and strength, as well as augmenting her already ferocious personality.

David's Klarion
Klarion played a significant part in the 2000 event Young Justice: Sins of Youth, in which he became involved in a plot by the Agenda to turn the public against the metahuman community, targeting juvenile super-heroes as the weakest link in the chain. He increased distrust and confusion at a rally for young heroes, by casting a spell that turned the teenage heroes present into adults and the adult heroes observing the rally into teenagers. In this story, under writer Peter David, he began referring to himself as "Klarion... Bum, Bum, Bum... The Witch Boy", an affectation he has since ceased.

David's version of Klarion also appeared in July–June 2000's Young Justice #20- "Time Out" and #21 "Young, Just Us Too". In these issues, he expressed a feeling of loneliness after turning various villains into children during the "Sins of Youth" storyline and wished for a playmate of his own age. Li'l Lobo returned to attack Klarion and demand that Klarion return him to his normal age. A massive fight between Klarion, Lobo, and Young Justice breaks out, which Klarion seems to enjoy but in the end, Klarion still feels "incomplete". At the end of issue #21, Ariella Kent, Supergirl of the 853rd century, crash-lands in front of the Witch-Boy and the two become fast friends.

Morrison's Klarion
In 2005, a new version of Klarion starred in his own mini-series as one of the seven main characters in Grant Morrison's Seven Soldiers of Victory. Morrison described this character as a return to the original Kirby version with some updates, including the return of Klarion's original overall look, and a move away from the Peter David version. The new version of Klarion is an inhabitant of an underground community known as Limbo Town, inhabited by the Puritan witch descendants of the lost population of Roanoke. Limbo Town is actually located beneath New York City's subway system. Being a rebellious sort, Klarion clashes with the controlling and pious Submissionary Judah, the religious leader and defender of the town. Klarion attempts to leave, but in doing so attracts the attention of a terrifying entity known as the Horigal.

The Horigal is severely crippled by a passing subway train (being driven by underground pirates from another Seven Soldiers project, The Manhattan Guardian), and Klarion manages to escape. In the tunnels below New York, he encounters a Witch-Man of Limbo Town called Ebeneezer Badde. Badde tries to defuse Klarion's enthusiasm for the outside world and later betrays the Witch-Boy, almost selling him into slavery. His conscience prompts him to help Klarion at the last minute but the unforgiving Witch-Boy allows Badde to be killed. Although it is not directly referenced in the story, there is speculation that Badde may in fact be Klarion's own missing father, Mordecai.

Eventually, Klarion makes it to the world above ("Blue Rafters"). There he is ensnared by the mysterious Mr. Melmoth (the Sheeda-King who spawned the Limbo Town people centuries ago with the women of the Roanoke colony). Melmoth encourages him to join a band of young super-delinquents. These children, along with Klarion, use their powers to steal an enormous digging machine from a New York museum of superheroes which, unbeknownst to Klarion, Melmoth plans to use to pillage Limbo Town.

When Teekl sees Melmoth pushing a member of the gang through a portal to 'the red place', Klarion tells the rest of the group of his evil, then abandons them.

Despite wanting to continue his adventures on the Earth's surface, Klarion returns to Limbo Town. There, the townsfolk try to burn him at the stake for blasphemy, but the arrival of Melmoth and his thugs convince the townsfolk not to do so. Klarion raises the alarm, then meets the dying Submissionary Judah, who passes on the title of Submissionary to Klarion now that all of the other Submissionaries are dead. With this comes the ability to become the Horigal (actually a gestalt form of the Submissionaries and their familiars), and Klarion promptly kills the thugs and cripples Melmoth, who vows to return after the Harrowing.

Afterwards, Klarion refuses his mother's offer to replace Submissionary Judah as leader of Limbo Town, saying: "I would like to be many things before I die, Mother. Today ... Today I shall be a soldier".

In Seven Soldiers #1, Klarion betrayed the fight against the Sheeda when he acquired the complete version of Croatoan, a powerful machine created by the New Gods for the New God-Neanderthal hybrid Aurakles, in the form of a pair of dice (in Sheeda tongue it is called a "Fatherbox"). He then took control of Frankenstein and had Frankenstein take him to Sheeda-Side where he now has incredible power.

Klarion also appeared in Infinite Crisis #6 along with many other members of DC's mystic community, an appearance which, according to Grant Morrison, takes place after Seven Soldiers.

Klarion appeared in January–February 2007's Robin #157–158. In this story, he encountered Robin while pursuing another inhabitant of Limbo Town to Gotham City. It appears that the previous version of Klarion and Teekl has been completely wiped from the DCU, as Robin has no memory of anyone by that name upon first meeting Klarion. Furthermore, Klarion dubs Robin a friend and hero at the end of the story. Such a wipe and re-introduction on a minor character in the DC universe is usually due to erasure for character reinvention during one of the DCU multi-verse reshaping "Crisis" storylines, e.g. Crisis on Infinite Earths and Infinite Crisis.

Morrison states in the annotations of the collected versions of Seven Soldiers that "DC continuity freaks may also see how easy it is to imagine Klarion proceeding from the finale of Seven Soldiers and heading back in time to make his first appearance in Kirby's The Demon issue #6".

Countdown
During the Countdown series, Klarion encounters Mary Marvel, who has recently been given Black Adam's powers, and is finding them hard to control. Klarion offers to help, in return for a fraction of Mary's power. This turns out to be a ruse, and Klarion attempts to absorb all of Mary's powers, but he is soundly defeated by her.

During the events of Brightest Day, Klarion is possessed by Alan Scott's Starheart power and driven insane. After wreaking havoc throughout an urban area, he is tracked down and defeated by Jade and Donna Troy.

Superman/Batman Sorcerer Kings
Klarion plays a major role in the events of the Sorcerer Kings three-issue storyline in Superman/Batman. He appears on the final page of issue #82, and in issue #83 he leads the current-timeline Batman, Doctor Occult and Detective Chimp to the "witches' road" while his future self is a member of the Justice League on a magic-controlled Earth.<ref>{{Cite news | url=http://www.dccomics.com/comics/supermanbatman-2003/supermanbatman-82 | title=Superman/Batman #82| newspaper=DC| date=15 March 2021}} and </ref>

Batgirl (vol. 3)
Klarion's last appearance before The New 52 was in Chalk (heart) Outline, a Valentine's Day themed story in Batgirl volume 3, #18. Klarion and Stephanie Brown as Batgirl must stop Teekl's rampage, which involves a trip to Limbotown.

The New 52
In September 2011, The New 52 rebooted DC's continuity. In this new timeline, Klarion made his first appearance in Teen Titans: Futures End #1 in September 2014.
 
He starred in his own comic book series written by Ann Nocenti and drawn by Trevor McCarthy in October 2014. The series ended after six issues.

 Dark Crisis on Infinite Earths 
Klarion would later appear in a tie-in during the events of Dark Crisis, having since allied himself with Deathstroke's Dark Army and ascended into becoming a Lord of Chaos.

Powers and abilities
An extremely powerful and talented warlock, he is considered one of the most dangerous magic users in creation despite his appearance and temperament. He has a plethora of knowledge of various magic and spells, affording him nearly limitless abilities such as being able to transform himself, travel into other dimensions, energy projection, shapeshifting, telekinesis, etc. Much of these powers are tied with his witch-cat familiar, Teekl, able to have a psychic link and able to perform magic so long as Teekl is intact, who exhibits some magical powers of their own. Klarion will often bolster Teekl's natural magic with his own to lessen the chance of himself fading away, or to give them an edge in combat (such as by changing their body into a more vicious humanoid form).

Despite his grand power, Klarion is still a young adolescent who's often  characterized behaving as such; acting in an unpredictable and immature manner when situations do not pan out in his favor, even lashing out in temper-tantrums. Due to Teekl being his familiar, Klarion requires them to stay anchored to Earth's realm. While an apt spell-caster, more experienced spell-casters such as Sebastian Faust have bested him in battle.

Other versions
 Earth-11 
On Earth-11, a gender swapped female version of Klarion appears named Klarieene the Witch-Girl. Unlike his original incarnations, Klarieene is considered both a teenaged hero affiliated with Teen Justice (an alternate, gender swapped version of the Teen Titans) and is being mentored by Zatara, the gender-swapped version of Zatanna Zatara.

 Injustice: Gods Among Us (tie-in comic) 
Klarion appears in Year Three of the Injustice: Gods Among Us tie-in comic, where he's recruited by Batman and John Constantine, along with several other magic users at Jason Blood's mansion. When Harvey Bullock opens up the front doors, Teekl senses something approaching as the seals are broken and Bullock and Blood are killed by the approaching presence. Klarion then uses his link with Teekl and sends his cat outside, where he learns that their attacker is The Spectre. While Batman distracts Spectre, Klarion has Zatanna teleport him and the others to the Tower of Fate. Later, when Constantine assures his daughter, Rose that Detective Chimp will be fine, Klarion says that he'll surely die. Constantine then demands him to do something, but Klarion snaps at him before he eventually agrees to help. Klarion then later tracks Raven's astral form as it escapes and reports to Constantine about his plan, which Constantine reveals that Batman is unaware of their plan. The two of them then steal Raven's physical body. During the final battle in the Tower of Fate, Klarion is quickly killed by Sinestro.

 Justice League Beyond 
Klarion the Warlock appears in Justice League Beyond, where he and many other magic users, including Felix Faust, Ragman, Amethyst, Princess of Gemworld and Nightmistress, assist the Justice League against the threat of Brainiac and his plan to turn Earth into Krypton. He and Nightmistress manage to rescue Doctor Fate. During the final battle on Themyscira, Klarion decides to abandon the battle and return to his own kingdom to prepare his forces against Brainiac.

 Flashpoint 
In Flashpoint, Klarion was recruited to join the Secret Seven before he seemingly killed himself, but it's suspected that Shade, the Changing Man killed him and the other members while under the control of the M-Vest.

 Batman: Lil Gotham 
In Batman: Lil Gotham, Klarion tries to hire a carpenter, Jenna Duffy to build a cage for his pet demon, Etrigan, but she kicks him out, since it's her day off.

In other media
Television

 Klarion appears in The New Batman Adventures episode "The Demon Within", voiced by Stephen Wolfe Smith. He often calls Jason Blood "Uncle Jason", even though the two are not related. Blood claims that Klarion does it for mere amusement. He is outbid by Bruce Wayne in an auction for an ancient branding iron which supposedly had mystic properties given to it by Morgaine le Fey. Using the iron, he takes control over Etrigan, but is eventually defeated and imprisoned in a crystal ball.
 Klarion the Witch Boy is referenced in the Batman Beyond episode "Revenant". An elderly Bruce Wayne talks about how he believes in the supernatural due to encounters with everything from zombies to "witch-boys".
 Klarion the Witch Boy appears in Cartoon Monsoon, voiced by Tara Strong.
 Klarion the Witch Boy (alongside Teekl) appears in Young Justice, voiced by Thom Adcox-Hernandez while Teekl's vocal effects are provided by Dee Bradley Baker. This version is a member of the Lords of Chaos, as well as the Light.
 Klarion the Witch Boy appears in Justice League Action, voiced by Noel Fisher. This version is a recurring enemy of the Justice League and seeker of mystical artifacts.

Video games
 Klarion the Witch Boy appears in DC Universe Online, voiced by Pablo Thiel. He is the main focus of their Halloween seasonal event, The Witching Hour where he steals the powers of many magic heroes and villains to unleash hell in Gotham. It is up to the heroes to help Phantom Stranger and the villains to help Tala in stopping him.
 Klarion appears in Young Justice: Legacy, voiced again by Thom Adcox-Hernandez. Klarion plays a large role in the last part of the game, deceiving and kidnapping both Tula (Aquagirl) and pieces of a statue needed for Tiamat's revival. He takes her to ancient ruins in Bialya, using her magic to revive Tiamat and keeping Marduk's Tablet of Destiny to himself as "payment". The Team arrives to stop him too late, as Tiamat is revived. Klarion loses the Tablet to Teekl, who carries it away. Both he and the heroes chase after it in the ruins. Klarion assists Blockbuster in stopping the young heroes as a last resort to keep the Tablet, but after it is broken, Klarion leaves. His actions make him indirectly responsible for Aquagirl's tragic death.
 Klarion the Witch Boy appears as a playable character in Lego DC Super-Villains'', voiced again by Thom Adcox-Hernandez.

References

External links
 Morrison's 7 Soldiers: Klarion, Comicon, September 8, 2005
 Seven Soldiers: Klarion annotations at Barbelith
 
 

Comics characters introduced in 1973
2005 comics debuts
DC Comics titles
DC Comics aliens
DC Comics fantasy characters
DC Comics characters who use magic
DC Comics witches
Characters created by Jack Kirby
Supervillains with their own comic book titles
Villains in animated television series